"Alone Together" is a song by American rock band Fall Out Boy from their fifth studio album Save Rock and Roll (2013). It was released to American mainstream radio as the album's third overall single and second mainstream radio single on August 6, 2013.

Composition
The song has been described by critics as a power pop and pop song.

Music video
The official music video is part of the Young Blood Chronicles, a musical film produced by the group featuring each song from the album. The story continues with Stump tied in a chapel, Hurley in a room with headphones on, forced to listen to horrible music, Wentz in a room with women taking pictures of him, and Trohman on a stage with kids throwing rotten food at him. Wentz escapes by seducing his way out. He then takes a woman's hook off her hand to kill her while the others are tortured by their captors. During his escape attempt, he rescues rapper Big Sean. When Wentz passes Stump, he puts the hook on Stump's arm stump. Wentz is quickly recaptured shortly after. Stump is electrocuted, although he is implied to have become "evil" after his procedure. With Big Sean watching nearby, the four band members are then brought to the van.

Live performances
The band has played the single on The Today Show on July 19, 2013, and used the first verse as a lead on to "My Songs Know What You Did in the Dark (Light Em Up)" during an America's Got Talent guest appearance. On October 10, 2013, Fall Out Boy performed "Alone Together" on American talk show The Ellen DeGeneres Show. They also played the song during the fifth-season finale of the Australian reality singing competition The X Factor on October 28, 2013, after their Save Rock and Roll Australian tour. Following the X Factor performance, the single debuted at number 40 on the Australian ARIA Singles Chart—the band's 11th entry on the chart—while Save Rock and Roll re-entered the albums chart at number 25. On November 19, Fall Out Boy was televised on Jimmy Kimmel Live! for the second time that year and played "Alone Together" and "My Songs Know..." (the latter for the second time on the show). During the 2013 Macy's Thanksgiving Day Parade, the band performed "Alone Together" on the Teenage Mutant Ninja Turtles float, with the Turtles dancing along and gesturing when the crowd was to "say yeah" as directed in the song.

Commercial performance
"Alone Together" debuted on the Billboard Pop Songs chart in mid-October and cracked the U.S. Billboard Hot 100 week ending December 14, 2013, after spending a few weeks on the Bubbling Under Hot 100. On April 10, 2014, "Alone Together" was certified Gold by the RIAA and was upgraded to Platinum in November 2015 for 1 million units.

Remixes
 Alone Together (Krewella Remix)
 Alone Together (Jump Smokers Remix)

Charts

Weekly charts

Year-end charts

Certifications

Release history

References

2013 singles
Fall Out Boy songs
Songs written by Pete Wentz
Island Records singles
Songs written by Patrick Stump
Song recordings produced by Butch Walker
Songs written by Joe Trohman
Songs written by Andy Hurley
2013 songs